The qualifying phase of the 2013–14 UEFA Europa League were played from 2 July to 8 August, to define 29 entrants in the competition's play-off round, who would then in turn compete for a place in the group stage.

All times were CEST (UTC+2).

Round and draw dates
All draws were held at UEFA headquarters in Nyon, Switzerland.

Matches may also be played on Tuesdays or Wednesdays instead of the regular Thursdays due to scheduling conflicts.

Format
In the qualifying phase and play-off round, each tie was played over two legs, with each team playing one leg at home. The team that scored more goals on aggregate over the two legs advanced to the next round. If the aggregate score was level, the away goals rule was applied, i.e., the team that scored more goals away from home over the two legs advanced. If away goals were also equal, then thirty minutes of extra time was played. The away goals rule was again applied after extra time, i.e., if there were goals scored during extra time and the aggregate score was still level, the visiting team advanced by virtue of more away goals scored. If no goals were scored during extra time, the tie was decided by penalty shoot-out.

In the draws for each round, teams were seeded based on their UEFA club coefficients at the beginning of the season, with the teams divided into seeded and unseeded pots. A seeded team was drawn against an unseeded team, with the order of legs in each tie decided randomly. Due to the limited time between matches, the draws for the second and third qualifying rounds took place before the results of the previous round were known. For these draws (or in any cases where the result of a tie in the previous round was not known at the time of the draw), the seeding was carried out under the assumption that the team with the higher coefficient of an undecided tie advanced to this round, which means if the team with the lower coefficient was to advance, it simply took the seeding of its defeated opponent. Prior to the draws, UEFA may form "groups" in accordance with the principles set by the Club Competitions Committee, but they were purely for convenience of the draw and for ensuring that teams from the same association were not drawn against each other, and did not resemble any real groupings in the sense of the competition.

Teams
A total of 133 teams were involved in the first three qualifying rounds, 29 of which advanced to the play-off round.

Below were the participating teams (with their 2013 UEFA club coefficients), grouped by their starting rounds.

Notes

First qualifying round

Seeding
A total of 76 teams played in the first qualifying round. The draw was held on 24 June 2013.

Notes

Matches
The first legs were played on 2, 3 and 4 July, and the second legs were played on 9, 10 and 11 July 2013.

|}

Notes

First leg

Second leg

Rudar Pljevlja won 2–1 on aggregate.

Jeunesse Esch won 3–2 on aggregate.

Differdange 03 won 3–1 on aggregate.

Linfield won 5–0 on aggregate.

Irtysh Pavlodar won 2–0 on aggregate.

1–1 on aggregate. Ventspils won on away goals.

Gefle won 8–1 on aggregate.

Pyunik won 2–1 on aggregate.

Khazar Lankaran won 2–1 on aggregate.

2–2 on aggregate. Mladost Podgorica won on away goals.

Breiðablik won 4–0 on aggregate.

Žilina won 6–3 on aggregate.

4–4 on aggregate. Turnovo won 5–4 on penalties.

Víkingur Gøta won 2–1 on aggregate.

Milsami Orhei won 1–0 on aggregate.

Qarabağ won 2–0 on aggregate.

3–3 on aggregate. Prestatyn Town won 4–3 on penalties.

1–1 on aggregate. Skonto won 4–2 on penalties.

Levadia Tallinn won 3–2 on aggregate.

Dinamo Minsk won 8–0 on aggregate.

Valletta won 4–0 on aggregate.

Aktobe won 4–2 on aggregate.

Zrinjski Mostar won 4–1 on aggregate.

1–1 on aggregate. Chikhura Sachkhere won on away goals.

Malmö FF won 2–0 on aggregate.

Inter Baku won 3–1 on aggregate.

Tromsø won 3–2 on aggregate.

Rosenborg won 9–3 on aggregate.

3–3 on aggregate. Dacia Chişinău won on away goals.

1–1 on aggregate. Kukësi won on away goals.

Botev Plovdiv won 6–0 on aggregate.

Astra Giurgiu won 3–0 on aggregate.

ÍBV won 2–1 on aggregate.

KR won 3–0 on aggregate.

Vojvodina won 7–3 on aggregate.

Honvéd won 13–1 on aggregate.

Žalgiris Vilnius won 4–3 on aggregate.

Sarajevo won 3–1 on aggregate.

Second qualifying round

Seeding
A total of 80 teams played in the second qualifying round: 42 teams which entered in this round, and the 38 winners of the first qualifying round. The draw was held on 24 June 2013.

Notes

Matches
The first legs were played on 16 and 18 July, and the second legs were played on 25 July 2013.

|}

Notes

First leg

Second leg

Rubin Kazan won 4–2 on aggregate.

2–2 on aggregate. Milsami Orhei won 4–2 on penalties.

Trenčín won 2–1 on aggregate.

Minsk won 3–1 on aggregate.

Śląsk Wrocław won 6–2 on aggregate.

3–3 on aggregate. Žilina won on away goals.

Qarabağ won 4–3 on aggregate.

Hajduk Split won 3–2 on aggregate.

Thun won 5–1 on aggregate.

Aktobe won 2–1 on aggregate.

Maccabi Haifa won 10–0 on aggregate.

Ventspils won 5–1 on aggregate.

Žalgiris Vilnius won 3–1 on aggregate.

Tromsø won 2–1 on aggregate.

Breiðablik won 1–0 on aggregate.

Häcken won 3–2 on aggregate.

Astra Giurgiu won 3–2 on aggregate.

2–2 on aggregate. Slovan Liberec won on away goals.

Pandurii Târgu Jiu won 4–0 on aggregate.

Hapoel Tel Aviv won 6–3 on aggregate.

Gefle won 4–3 on aggregate.

Chornomorets Odesa won 3–2 on aggregate.

Botev Plovdiv won 3–1 on aggregate.

Mladost Podgorica won 3–2 on aggregate.

Differdange 03 won 5–4 on aggregate.

Petrolul Ploiești won 7–0 on aggregate.

Rijeka won 8–0 on aggregate.

4–4 on aggregate. Dinamo Minsk won on away goals.

Dila Gori won 3–0 on aggregate.

Strømsgodset won 5–2 on aggregate.

Red Star Belgrade won 2–0 on aggregate.

Vojvodina won 5–1 on aggregate.

Standard Liège won 6–2 on aggregate.

Široki Brijeg won 4–3 on aggregate.

2–2 on aggregate. Xanthi won on away goals.

Malmö FF won 9–0 on aggregate.

Lech Poznań won 5–2 on aggregate.

St Johnstone won 2–1 on aggregate.

Trabzonspor won 7–2 on aggregate.

Kukësi won 3–2 on aggregate.

Third qualifying round

Seeding
A total of 58 teams played in the third qualifying round: 18 teams which entered in this round, and the 40 winners of the second qualifying round. The draw was held on 19 July 2013.

Notes

Matches
The first legs were played on 1 August, and the second legs were played on 8 August 2013.

|}

First leg

Second leg

Rijeka won 3–2 on aggregate.

Astra Giurgiu won 5–3 on aggregate.

Rubin Kazan won 4–1 on aggregate.

Dila Gori won 2–0 on aggregate.

Kukësi won 2–1 on aggregate.

Maccabi Haifa won 3–0 on aggregate.

2–2 on aggregate. Žalgiris Vilnius won on away goals.

Pandurii Târgu Jiu won 3–2 on aggregate.

Kuban Krasnodar won 3–0 on aggregate.

Saint-Étienne won 6–0 on aggregate.

Qarabağ won 3–0 on aggregate.

Estoril won 1–0 on aggregate.

Slovan Liberec won 4–2 on aggregate.

1–1 on aggregate. Tromsø won 4–3 on penalties.

Vojvodina won 5–2 on aggregate.

Thun won 3–1 on aggregate.

Swansea City won 4–0 on aggregate.

Trabzonspor won 1–0 on aggregate.

Petrolul Ploiești won 3–2 on aggregate.

Jablonec won 5–2 on aggregate.

1–1 on aggregate. Stuttgart won on away goals.

Chornomorets Odesa won 3–1 on aggregate.

Sevilla won 9–1 on aggregate.

Rapid Wien won 4–2 on aggregate.

Standard Liège won 4–2 on aggregate.

Udinese won 7–1 on aggregate.

Śląsk Wrocław won 4–3 on aggregate.

1–1 on aggregate. Minsk won 3–2 on penalties.

1–1 on aggregate. Aktobe won 2–1 on penalties.

Play-off round

Statistics
There were 720 goals in 274 matches in the qualifying phase and play-off round, for an average of 2.63 goals per match.

Top goalscorers

Top assists

Notes

References

External links
2013–14 UEFA Europa League

1
UEFA Europa League qualifying rounds